Lactel is a brand of French company Lactalis specializing in organic milk products.

In August 2017, Lactel celebrated its 50th anniversary by launching a collector's edition signed by Mary Gribouille on its Lactel Vitamin D range. In November 2017, Lactel launched semi-skimmed milk "the call of the meadows".

Gallery

References

External links
  
 Official India Website ( India)
Dairy products companies of France
Products introduced in 1967